The fifth government of Francisco Franco was formed on 25 February 1957.

Franco's fifth cabinet was made up of members from the different factions or "families" within the National Movement: mainly the FET y de las JONS party—the only legal political party during the Francoist regime—the military, the National Catholic Association of Propagandists (ACNP) and a number of aligned-nonpartisan figures from the civil service; however for the first time, the cabinet would see the incorporation of several technocratic ministers from the Opus Dei. The new government saw the establishment for the first time of a Ministry of Housing.

Council of Ministers
The Council of Ministers was structured into the office for the prime minister and 18 ministries, including one minister without portfolio and the office of the minister undersecretary of the presidency.

Departmental structure
Francisco Franco's fifth government was organised into several superior and governing units, whose number, powers and hierarchical structure varied depending on the ministerial department.

Unit/body rank
() Undersecretary
() Director-general
() Military & intelligence agency

Notes

References

Bibliography

External links
Governments. Dictatorship of Franco (18.07.1936 / 20.11.1975). CCHS–CSIC (in Spanish).
Governments of Franco. Dictatorship Chronology (1939–1975). Fuenterrebollo Portal (in Spanish).
The governments of the Civil War and Franco's dictatorship (1936–1975). Lluís Belenes i Rodríguez History Page (in Spanish).
Biographies. Royal Academy of History (in Spanish).

1957 establishments in Spain
1962 disestablishments in Spain
Cabinets established in 1957
Cabinets disestablished in 1962
Council of Ministers (Spain)